Tephritis sauterina is a species of tephritid or fruit flies in the genus Tephritis of the family Tephritidae.

Distribution
Switzerland.

References

Tephritinae
Insects described in 1994
Diptera of Europe